Donald Barr Chidsey (May 14, 1902 – March 17, 1981) was an American writer, biographer, historian, novelist and writer of adventure fiction.

Biography 
Donald Barr Chidsey was born in Elizabeth, New Jersey, on May 14, 1902.  He worked at the Elizabeth Daily Journal, and traveled widely in his youth. He lived in Lyme, Connecticut for many years.

In 1935 he married Shirley Chidsey (born Elinor Shirley Stewart) and went with her to Tahiti, where she sailed in his boat and helped to manage a coconut plantation. While they made friends with a number of writers, including F. Scott Fitzgerald. Shirley separated from him in February 1940. She went to join the Office of Strategic Services (OSS) (CIA’s forerunner), in 1943 she worked in the Belgian Congo to keep the unique uranium mine in Katanga province Shinkolobwe out of the hands of the Axis powers. The uranium was later used in the creation of the bombs dropped on Hiroshima and Nagasaki.

Along with artist W. Langdon Kihn, Chidsey was a Democratic candidate for the Connecticut House of Representatives from the town of Lyme, in the November 2, 1948 election.

Donald Barr Chidsey died on March 17, 1981, in Lawrence Memorial Hospital at New London, Connecticut.

Writings

Chidsey wrote more than fifty books. Chidsey began his writing career as a contributor to the pulp magazines, especially Argosy and Adventure. Chidsey wrote crime fiction for Black Mask and Dime Detective magazines. Chidsey wrote several historical novels, in the "swashbuckler" style of Rafael Sabatini. These included This Bright Sword (1957) about the return of Richard I to England. Captain Bashful (1955) and Reluctant Cavalier (1960), are set in Elizabethan era England. His Majesty's Highwayman (1958) is about a young man forced to join a gang of highwaymen in eighteenth-century England.  Stronghold (1948) is set against the backdrop of the War of 1812.

Alden Whitman called him "an old hand at light writing." According to Kirkus Reviews, Chidsey "is known for his popular American histories, and has a nose for a good story." He lived in Lyme, Connecticut for many years.

Works

Biographies
 Sir Walter Raleigh, That Damned Upstart
 Sir Humphrey Gilbert, Elizabeth's Racketeer
 Marlborough, The Portrait of a Conqueror
 John The Great (boxing champion John L. Sullivan)
 Bonnie Prince Charlie
 The World of Samuel Adams
 Andrew Jackson, Hero
 Elizabeth I: A Great Life in Brief
 The Gentleman from New York: A Life of Roscoe Conkling

Histories
 The American Privateers
 And Tyler Too
 The Battle of New Orleans
 The Birth of the Constitution
 The California Gold Rush
 The Day They Sank the Lusitania
 The French and Indian War: An Informal History
 Goodbye to Gunpowder: An Informal History
 The Great Conspiracy: Aaron Burr and His Strange Doings in the West
 The Great Separation
 July 4, 1776: The dramatic story of the first four days of July 1776
 Lewis and Clark: The Great Adventure
 The Louisiana Purchase: the story of the biggest real estate deal in history
 The Loyalists: the story of those Americans who fought against independence
 Mr. Hamilton and Mr. Jefferson
 On and Off the Wagon
 The Panama Canal
 Shackleton's Voyage
 The Siege of Boston: an on-the-scene account of the beginning of the American Revolution
 The Spanish–American War: a behind-the-scenes account of the war in Cuba
 The Tide Turns
 Valley Forge
 Victory at Yorktown
 The War in the North: an informal history of the American Revolution in and near Canada
 The War in the South: an informal history of the Carolinas and Georgia in the American Revolution
 The War with Mexico
 The Wars in Barbary: Arab piracy and the birth of the United States Navy

Novels
 Buccaneer's Blade
 Captain Adam
 Captain Bashful
 Captain Crossbones
 Each One Was Alone
 Edge of Piracy
 Fancy-Man
 The Flaming Island
 His Majesty's Highwayman
 The Legion of the Lost
 Lord of the Isles
 Marooned
 The Naked Sword
 Panama Passage
 The Pipes Are Calling
 Pistols in the Morning
 Reluctant Cavalier
 Rod Rides High
 Singapore Passage
 Stronghold
 This Bright Sword
 Weeping is for Women
 The Wickedest Pilgrim

References

1902 births
1981 deaths
20th-century American historians
American male novelists
20th-century American novelists
American historical novelists
Writers of historical fiction set in the Middle Ages
Writers of historical fiction set in the early modern period
Writers of historical fiction set in the modern age
Connecticut Democrats
20th-century American male writers
20th-century American non-fiction writers
American male non-fiction writers